Thomas Capel may refer to:

 Thomas Bladen Capel (1776–1853),  British Royal Navy officer
 Thomas John Capel (1836–1911), Roman Catholic priest
 Tommy Capel (1922–2009), English professional footballer
 Thomas Edward Capel (1770–1855), English soldier and sportsman